Two ships of Bangladesh Navy carried the name BNS Abu Bakr or Abu Bakar:
 , a  transferred from the Royal Navy.
 , a Type 053H2 (Jianghu-III) frigate transferred from the People's Liberation Army Navy.

Bangladesh Navy ship names